Gunabati Multilateral High School is located in the heart of Gunabati Bazar. It is affiliated to the Comilla Board.

History 
It was established in 1944.

Education program 
In Gunabati High School, the educational activities of the SSC section are conducted under the Comilla Education Board.

Co-education programs 
 Scouting 
 Sports (athletics, cricket and football)
 Debating 
 Cultural events
 Learning tour etc.

Uniform 
The uniform of Gunabati High School consists of a white-colored shirt with blue pants. Either long sleeve or short sleeve shirts are acceptable. Shirts must have the School monogram badge on the right sleeve.

See also 
 List of Educational Institutions in Comilla

References 

High schools in Bangladesh
Schools in Comilla District